David Andrew Myrie Medrano (born June 1, 1988) is a Costa Rican former professional footballer.

Club career
Myrie started his professional career with Cádiz of the Spanish Segunda División. He later moved back to Costa Rica, play with both Puntarenas, and Alajuelense. Myrie made 12 appearances for Puntarenas during the 2007–08 season and 16 appearances for Alajuelense during the 2008–09 season.

Major League Soccer
He was signed by the Chicago Fire on September 15, 2009, but did not make any league appearances for the club. Myrie was subsequently selected by Philadelphia Union in the 2009 MLS Expansion Draft on 25 November 2009, before he had made his senior debut for Chicago. On March 30, 2010 Myrie was released by the Philadelphia Union, despite starting in the club's inaugural game.

On August 2, 2011 Myrie was announced as the new player of Fredrikstad Fotballklubb (FFK) Myrie was signed as a replacement for Cristian Gamboa, who was sold to FC København one day before Myrie came to Fredrikstad.

On May 27, 2013 Myrie was signed by Herediano of the Primera División de Costa Rica.

International career
Myrie was part of the Costa Rican 2005 FIFA U-17 World Championship squad as well as the 2007 FIFA U-20 World Cup squad.

He made his senior debut for Costa Rica in a November 2010 friendly match against Jamaica and has, as of May 2014, earned a total of 12 caps, scoring no goals. He was a last minute inclusion in the 2014 FIFA World Cup squad after injury to Heiner Mora and played one game in Brazil. He also played at the 2011 Copa Centroamericana.

Personal life
David is the younger brother of fellow Costa Rican international defender Roy Myrie.

References

External links
 
 
 David Myrie at Footballdatabase

1988 births
Living people
People from Limón Province
Association football defenders
Costa Rican footballers
Costa Rica international footballers
Costa Rica under-20 international footballers
2011 Copa Centroamericana players
2014 FIFA World Cup players
2014 Copa Centroamericana players
2015 CONCACAF Gold Cup players
Cádiz CF players
Puntarenas F.C. players
L.D. Alajuelense footballers
Chicago Fire FC players
Philadelphia Union players
Fredrikstad FK players
C.S. Herediano footballers
A.D. San Carlos footballers
Deportivo Saprissa players
Municipal Pérez Zeledón footballers
Costa Rican expatriate footballers
Expatriate footballers in Spain
Expatriate soccer players in the United States
Expatriate footballers in Norway
Liga FPD players
Eliteserien players
Major League Soccer players
Copa Centroamericana-winning players
Costa Rica youth international footballers